You Find It Everywhere is a 1921 American silent comedy film directed by Charles Horan and starring Catherine Calvert, Herbert Rawlinson and Macey Harlam. It is based on the 1919 novel The Gibson Upright by Booth Tarkington.

Cast
 Catherine Calvert as Nora Gorodna
 Herbert Rawlinson as 	Andrew Gibson
 Macey Harlam as José Ferra
 Riley Hatch as 	Dan Carter
 Nathaniel Sack as Wurtzel Pantz 
 Arnold Lucy as Charles Simpson
 Robert Ayerton as Ignatius Riley
 Jack Drumier as Harvey Hill
 Norbert Wicki as Salvatore
 Peggy Worth as Lila Normand
 Dora Mills Adams as 	Mrs. Normand
 Hattie Delaro as 	Mrs. Simpson

References

Bibliography
 Connelly, Robert B. The Silents: Silent Feature Films, 1910-36, Volume 40, Issue 2. December Press, 1998.
 Munden, Kenneth White. The American Film Institute Catalog of Motion Pictures Produced in the United States, Part 1. University of California Press, 1997.

External links
 

1921 films
1921 comedy films
1920s English-language films
American silent feature films
Silent American comedy films
Films directed by Charles Horan
American black-and-white films
1920s American films